Scholtzia leptantha is a shrub species in the family Myrtaceae that is endemic to Western Australia.

It blooms between June and November producing white flowers.

It is found on dunes along the west coast in the Mid West and Wheatbelt regions of Western Australia between Shark Bay and Dandaragan where it grows in sandy soils.

References

leptantha
Plants described in 1867